Charles Henry Guth (born August 18, 1947), is a former Major League Baseball shortstop who played three games in  with the Minnesota Twins, going hitless in three at bats.  He batted and threw right-handed.

He was drafted by the Atlanta Braves in the 20th round of the 1969 Major League Baseball Draft.  He attended West Virginia University, where he played college baseball for the Mountaineers from 1967–1969.

References

External links

1966 births
Living people
Baseball players from Maryland
Major League Baseball shortstops
Minnesota Twins players
West Virginia Mountaineers baseball players